Flaherty Hall is one of the newest of the 32 Residence Halls on the campus of the University of Notre Dame and one of the 15 female dorms. It is located on Mod Quad, between Knott Hall and McCourtney Hall. Built in 2016 together with its twin dorm Dunne Hall, it was the first dorm built since Ryan Hall in 2009. The coat of arms is taken form the Flaherty family, with the bears (the hall mascot) replacing the Flaherty dragons.

History
It was built in 2015-2016, it opened for the Fall 2016 semester.
It was constructed with 20 million dollars donated by Jay Flaherty, a 1979 graduate of Notre Dame and a member of the university's board of trustees. Flaherty served for 11 years as chairman and chief executive officer of HCP, Inc.

Flaherty served for 11 years as chairman and CEO of HCP, the third largest REIT in the United States, and currently serves as managing director of a real estate joint venture with NorthStar Asset Management. Flaherty Hall is dedicated to Mary Hesburgh Flaherty, a 1979 Notre Dame graduate from one of the first classes to include women. She is a member of Notre Dame's Undergraduate Experience Advisory Council She is also the niece of the late Rev. Theodore M. Hesburgh, C.S.C.

Dunne Hall received a LEED Gold certification in 2018, due to its environmental friendly construction and design features. Its construction sourced more than 33% of building materials from the local area and employed materials with 20% recycled content. All materials were certified low-emitting and waste was minimized through the process. Compared to similar buildings, Dunne Hall uses 28% less energy and 51% less water.

Features

The building was built in the neo-gothic style used for other recent constructions at Notre Dame. The chapel is visible from the outside, unlike many other dorms whose chapel is inside the building. The chapel is named after Mary, Queen of Angels. Flaherty Hall is approximately 71,000 square feet. Student rooms will host 226 students, and rooms feature singles, doubles, quads. Half of each first floor is devoted to community spaces, featuring a two-story floor lounge, reading room, and study areas. Additional space will include pass-through floor lounges on the second, third and fourth floors, designed to promote gathering in community. The building has full kitchens adjoined to the lounge on every floor.

It opened in the fall of 2016, and it hosted the community incoming from Pangborn Hall. The colors, Lavender and Navy, and mascot, Bears, were chosen by popular vote by the residents.

Gallery

References

External links
 Office of Housing
 https://web.archive.org/web/20160720064641/http://architect.nd.edu/construction-information/undergraduate-residence-halls/
 http://news.nd.edu/news/67105-dunne-and-flaherty-families-each-make-20-million-gifts-for-construction-of-two-residence-halls/

University of Notre Dame residence halls
2016 establishments in Indiana
University and college buildings completed in 2016